Let's Be Daring, Madame (French: Le coin tranquille) is a 1957 French comedy film directed by Robert Vernay and starring Dany Robin, Marie Daëms and Louis Velle. It was shot at the Saint-Maurice Studios in Paris and on location in the Forest of Rambouillet. The film's sets were designed by the art director Claude Bouxin.

Synopsis
After they get stranded in the woods on a camping expedition, two friends try to take shelter in an isolated house.

Cast
 Dany Robin as 	Danielle
 Marie Daëms as Lulu 
 Louis Velle as 	Jean
 Jacques Jouanneau as 	Dédé la Matraque
 Jess Hahn as 	Edward Butterfield dit 'Eddy'
 Armande Navarre as Alice
 Pauline Carton as 	La chef des choristes
 Max Elloy as 	Le brigadier
 Henri Charrett as Un gendarme
 Christian Lude as Un gendarme
 Claude Lary as Le gendarme radio 
 Jackie Sardou as Une passagère du premier car 
 Georges Demas as 	Le chauffeur du car des touristes / Le motard au barrage
 Henri Virlojeux as 	Le cantonnier
 Noël Roquevert as 	Le père Mathieu

References

Bibliography
 Bessy, Maurice. Histoire du cinéma français: 1956-1960. Pygmalion, 1986.

External links 
 

1957 films
1957 comedy films
French comedy films
1950s French-language films
Films directed by Robert Vernay
1950s French films

fr:Le Coin tranquille